Flora Isabel MacDonald,  (June 3, 1926 – July 26, 2015) was a Canadian politician and humanitarian. Canada's first female foreign minister, she was also one of the first women to vie for leadership of a major Canadian political party, the Progressive Conservatives. She became a close ally of Prime Minister Joe Clark, serving in his cabinet from 1979 to 1980, as well as in the cabinet of Prime Minister Brian Mulroney from 1984 to 1988. In her later life, she was known for her humanitarian work abroad. The City of Ottawa recognised MacDonald on July 11, 2018 by naming a new bicycle and footbridge (opening 2019) over the Rideau Canal the Passerelle Flora Footbridge.

Early life and career
MacDonald was born in North Sydney, Nova Scotia, the daughter of Mary Isabel Royle and George Frederick MacDonald. She was of Scottish ancestry.

Her grandfather had been a clipper ship captain who sailed around Africa and South America. Her father was in charge of North Sydney’s Western Union trans-Atlantic telegraph terminus.

In her youth, Macdonald trained as a secretary at Empire Business College and found work as a bank teller at the Bank of Nova Scotia. She used her savings to travel to Britain in 1950 where she got involved with a group of Scottish nationalists who stole the Stone of Scone from Westminster Abbey and brought it to Scotland.

After hitchhiking through Europe, she returned to Canada and became involved in politics, working on Nova Scotia Progressive Conservative leader Robert Stanfield's campaign which won an upset victory in the 1956 provincial election.

Later the same year, she was hired to work in the national office of the Progressive Conservative Party under leader John Diefenbaker, as secretary to the party's chairman, and worked on Diefenbaker's 1957 and 1958 election campaigns.

In 1959, she was working as a secretary in the office of Prime Minister of Canada John Diefenbaker.

She continued working for the party in various capacities but grew disillusioned with Diefenbaker and was fired by him when he learned of her support for party president Dalton Camp's campaign for a leadership review. She worked for the Department of Political Studies at Queen's University in Kingston, Ontario while continuing to support the anti-Diefenbaker camp and worked on Robert Stanfield's successful campaign during the 1967 Progressive Conservative leadership election and worked for him during the 1968 federal election.

Member of Parliament
MacDonald was first elected to the House of Commons in the 1972 general election as the Progressive Conservative Member of Parliament for the Ontario riding of Kingston and the Islands. She remained in parliament until her defeat in the 1988 election by the Liberal candidate, future Speaker Peter Milliken.

At the 1976 PC leadership convention, she became the second woman to mount a serious campaign for the leadership of one Canada's major parties. In this, she had been preceded by Rosemary Brown who came in second in her 1975 bid for the leadership of the New Democratic Party. Although she was perceived as a strong candidate for the position, MacDonald fared worse than expected, winning just 214 votes on the first ballot despite having over 300 pledged delegates in her camp. This led pundits to coin the phrases Flora Syndrome and Flora Factor for the phenomenon of a female politician's promised support failing to materialise. MacDonald dropped off after the second ballot, and encouraged her supporters to vote for Joe Clark, the eventual winner.

Minister of External Affairs
Clark and MacDonald, both moderates, became allies throughout their careers. When Clark became Prime Minister of Canada in 1979, MacDonald became the first female Secretary of State for External Affairs in Canadian history, and one of the first female foreign ministers anywhere in the world.

During MacDonald's tenure, she had to deal with the Vietnamese boat people refugee crises that followed the end of the Vietnam War. MacDonald and Immigration Minister Ron Atkey developed a plan in which the Canadian federal government would match the number of refugees sponsored by members of the general public, allowing more than 60,000 Vietnamese refugees to enter Canada.

The Iran hostage crisis was also a major issue during MacDonald's term. Six American diplomats had escaped the seizure of the American embassy by radical Iranian students and had sought refuge in the Canadian embassy in Tehran. MacDonald prevailed upon Prime Minister Joe Clark’s cabinet to approve by Order in Council the special issuance of Canadian passports as well as money to the six as part of a plan to rescue the escapees that had the Americans pose as Canadians and leave the country with Canadian staff when the embassy was closed on January 28, 1980, although she was not able to discuss her role publicly. The successful operation became known as the Canadian Caper, and it was later dramatized in the Academy Award-winning film Argo.

MacDonald's tenure as foreign minister was short-lived, however, as Clark's minority government was defeated on an amendment to the budget in December 1979, while MacDonald was on government business in Brussels. The PCs were voted out of office in the subsequent federal election held on February 18, 1980, although MacDonald held her seat.

Return to Opposition
The Conservatives returned to the Opposition benches in 1980. MacDonald served as critic for External Affairs, her old cabinet portfolio. While Clark continued as party leader, his position was challenged by calls for a leadership review which ultimately led to the 1983 leadership convention. MacDonald supported Clark in his campaign to regain the leadership, but Clark lost to Brian Mulroney.

Return to government
MacDonald returned to government after the PC victory in the 1984 federal election, serving first as Minister of Employment and Immigration from 1984 to 1986, and then as Minister of Communications from 1986 to 1988, under Prime Minister Mulroney. A Red Tory, MacDonald, within the federal cabinet, argued against Mulroney's push for free trade with the United States but publicly supported the Canada–United States Free Trade Agreement in the 1988 federal election. While the Progressive Conservatives won the election, which was fought on the free trade issue, MacDonald lost her seat to Liberal Peter Milliken. "I thought I deserved better than to be defeated after working so hard," MacDonald later stated.

After politics
After losing her seat in 1988, MacDonald quit politics and devoted her time to international humanitarian work. She served as Chair of the Board of Canada's International Development Research Centre from 1992 to 1997, and was also president of the World Federalist Movement-Canada.

In 2003, she briefly re-entered the political scene to oppose the merger of the Progressive Conservative Party of Canada and the Canadian Alliance, but was unable to prevent the folding of the PCs into the new Conservative Party of Canada. According to journalist Thomas Walkom, she voted for the New Democratic Party in the 2004 federal election. She was also a supporter of the Campaign for the Establishment of a United Nations Parliamentary Assembly, an organisation which campaigns for democratic reformation of the United Nations, and the creation of a more accountable international political system.

Death
MacDonald died in Ottawa on July 26, 2015 at the age of 89. Her death met with an outpouring of praise from figures across the political spectrum in Canada. Peter Milliken, who defeated her in the 1988 election, hailed her as a trailblazer for women in politics and said she did an "incredible job" as the country's foreign minister. Rodney MacDonald (no relation), a former premier of Nova Scotia, said she inspired generations of Canadians and was widely respected. Joe Clark, her onetime rival for leadership and later ally in PC politics, said she "changed lives across our country" and "around the world".

Honours
Sworn in as a member of the Queen's Privy Council for Canada on June 4, 1979, giving her the honorific prefix "The Honourable" and the post-nominal letters "PC" for life.
Kingston's prominent 400-boat harbour in front of City Hall is named the Flora MacDonald Confederation Basin in her honour.
Appointed Officer of the Order of Canada in 1992.
 Received the Order of Ontario in 1995.
Promoted to Companion of the Order of Canada in 1998.
Recipient of the Pearson Medal of Peace in 2000.
Awarded the Padma Shri, a civilian award, by the Government of India in 2004.
Peter Raymont made a National Film Board documentary of her 1976 leadership bid, entitled Flora.
Made a Member of the Order of Nova Scotia in 2007.
St. Andrew's Society of Toronto Scot of the Year Award, 2009.
Recipient of the Canada World Peace Award, awarded by the World Federalist Movement-Canada, October 2010.
 Advisory Council member of the Dancer Transition Resource Centre.
Awarded the Canadian Version of the Queen Elizabeth II Golden Jubilee Medal in 2002.
Awarded the Canadian Version of the Queen Elizabeth II Diamond Jubilee Medal in 2012.
Awarded a Lifetime Achievement Award by Maclean's magazine in 2014.
The City of Ottawa recognised MacDonald on July 11, 2018 by naming a new footbridge over the Rideau Canal the "Flora Footbridge".

Honorary degrees

Film
MacDonald’s bid to become the first female leader of the Progressive Conservatives was the subject of Peter Raymont’s 1977 National Film Board of Canada documentary film Flora: Scenes From a Leadership Convention, which premiered at the Toronto International Film Festival.

Archives 
There is a Flora MacDonald fonds at Library and Archives Canada.

References

External links
 

1926 births
2015 deaths
Canadian people of Scottish descent
Women members of the House of Commons of Canada
Companions of the Order of Canada
Members of the 21st Canadian Ministry
Members of the 24th Canadian Ministry
Members of the House of Commons of Canada from Ontario
Members of the Order of Nova Scotia
Members of the Order of Ontario
Members of the King's Privy Council for Canada
Members of the United Church of Canada
Recipients of the Padma Shri in public affairs
Progressive Conservative Party of Canada MPs
People from Kingston, Ontario
Women in Ontario politics
Female foreign ministers
Canadian Secretaries of State for External Affairs
Women government ministers of Canada
Canadian women diplomats
Progressive Conservative Party of Canada leadership candidates